Aleksandr Maksimovich Nekrasov (born 20 August 1998) is a Russian football player.

Club career
He made his debut in the Russian Football National League for FC Zenit-2 Saint Petersburg on 8 July 2017 in a game against FC Shinnik Yaroslavl.

References

External links
 
 Profile by Russian Football National League

1998 births
Footballers from Saint Petersburg
Living people
Russian footballers
Association football forwards
FC Zenit-2 Saint Petersburg players
FK Jelgava players
FC Ural Yekaterinburg players
FC Dynamo Saint Petersburg players
Russian expatriate footballers
Expatriate footballers in Latvia
Latvian Higher League players
FC Zenit Saint Petersburg players